Cloatley Manor Farm Meadows is a 12.1 hectare biological Site of Special Scientific Interest in Wiltshire, notified in 1997.

The site is managed as a nature reserve by Wiltshire Wildlife Trust.

Sources

 Natural England citation sheet for the site (accessed 23 March 2022)

External links
 Cloatley Meadows - Wiltshire Wildlife Trust
 Natural England website (SSSI information)

Sites of Special Scientific Interest in Wiltshire
Sites of Special Scientific Interest notified in 1997
Wiltshire Wildlife Trust reserves
Meadows in Wiltshire